Spring Valley Township is one of twelve townships of Greene County, Ohio, United States. As of the 2010 census, the population was 2,581, of whom 2,105 lived in the unincorporated portion of the township.

Geography
Located in the southwestern part of the county, it borders the following townships:
Beavercreek Township - north
Xenia Township - northeast
Caesarscreek Township - east
Sugarcreek Township - southeast
Chester Township, Clinton County - southwest
Wayne Township, Warren County - west

The village of Spring Valley is located in central Spring Valley Township.

The Little Miami River flows through Spring Valley Township.

Name and history
Spring Valley Township was created in 1856.

It is the only Spring Valley Township statewide.

Government
The township is governed by a three-member board of trustees, who are elected in November of odd-numbered years to a four-year term beginning on the following January 1. Two are elected in the year after the presidential election and one is elected in the year before it. There is also an elected township fiscal officer, who serves a four-year term beginning on April 1 of the year after the election, which is held in November of the year before the presidential election. Vacancies in the fiscal officership or on the board of trustees are filled by the remaining trustees.

References

External links
Spring Valley Township official website
County website

Townships in Greene County, Ohio
Townships in Ohio
1856 establishments in Ohio
Populated places established in 1856